Abdallah Asad Musa (born 6 August 1995), known as Saad Musa, is a South Sudanese footballer who plays as an attacking midfielder for Kenyan Premier League club AFC Leopards and the South Sudan national team.

References

External links

1996 births
Living people
People with acquired South Sudanese citizenship
South Sudanese footballers
Association football midfielders
South Sudan international footballers
South Sudanese Muslims
People from Kakamega County
Kenyan footballers
Nairobi City Stars players
Thika United F.C. players
A.F.C. Leopards players
Kenyan Premier League players
Kenyan people of South Sudanese descent
Kenyan Muslims